Corinth is an unincorporated community in Clay County, Alabama, United States, located  south-southeast of Lineville.

References

Unincorporated communities in Clay County, Alabama
Unincorporated communities in Alabama